Joe's Blues is an album recorded by American jazz saxophonist Johnny Hodges and organist Wild Bill Davis featuring performances recorded in 1965 and released on the Verve label.

Reception

The Allmusic site awarded the album 3 stars.

Track listing
 "Joe's Blues" (Wild Bill Davis) - 6:03
 "I'll Walk Alone" (Jule Styne, Sammy Cahn) - 4:23
 "Harmony in Harlem" (Duke Ellington, Irving Mills, Johnny Hodges) - 3:30
 "Warm Valley" (Ellington) - 4:27
 "Wild Bill Blues" (Hodges) - 5:10
 "Somebody Loves Me" (George Gershwin, Ballard MacDonald, Buddy DeSylva) - 4:55
 "Solitude" (Ellington, Eddie DeLange, Irving Mills) - 6:00
 "Clementine" (Billy Strayhorn) - 3:10

Personnel
Johnny Hodges - alto saxophone
Wild Bill Davis - organ
Lawrence Brown - trombone
Grant Green - guitar
Bob Cranshaw - double bass (tracks 1, 3, 4 & 7)
Bob Bushnell - electric bass (tracks 2, 5, 6 & 8)
Grady Tate - drums

References

Johnny Hodges albums
Wild Bill Davis albums
1965 albums
Albums produced by Creed Taylor
Verve Records albums
Albums recorded at Van Gelder Studio